Jargalant ("Happiness", also Ulaantolgoi) is a sum (district) of Orkhon Province in central northern Mongolia. In 2009, its population was 3,166.

References 

Districts of Orkhon Province